Gongora armeniaca is a species of orchid found in Costa Rica, Panama and Nicaragua.

References 

armeniaca
Orchids of Costa Rica
Orchids of Nicaragua
Orchids of Panama